John Bloss may refer to:

 John M. Bloss (1839–1905), American Civil War soldier and administrator
John Bloss (American football), for Iona Gaels football
John Bloss (politician), see Political party strength in Indiana
John Bloss (judge), North Carolina judicial elections, 2010